The Mount Allison Mounties football team represents Mount Allison University in Sackville, New Brunswick in the sport of Canadian football in U Sports. The Mounties program has been in continuous operation since 1955 when they played an exhibition schedule and then officially joined the New Brunswick Football League (NBFL) in 1956. The football team was an inaugural member of the Maritime Intercollegiate Football League (MIFL), which was a precursor to the current sporting association, Atlantic University Sport.

The team has twice appeared in the Vanier Cup, once in 1984, and again in 1991, losing both times. The Mounties have won six conference championships in 14 appearances, including four straight from 2013 to 2016. Only one Mounties player has won the Hec Crighton Trophy, Canadian Football Hall of Fame member, Éric Lapointe, who won the award twice and has since had his number retired by the program.

Recent history
In June 2008, Kelly Jeffrey was named interim head coach for the 2008 season and led the Mounties to a berth in the playoffs for only the second time in the new millennium. Under his tutelage, quarterback Kelly Hughes was named the AUS Most Valuable Player. After this season, Jeffrey was named full-time head coach.

2009 saw the Mounties go 0-8, but Gary Ross was named AUS MVP, the first time since 1991 and 1992 (Grant Keaney) that Mounties were named MVPs in back-to-back years. 2010 was the resurgence of the Mounties, led by second-year quarterback Jake Hotchkiss, who that year became the second Mountie quarterback under Jeffrey to be named an AUS All-Star. The Mounties went 4-4 and hosted the AUS Semi-Final for the first time, which was also the first home playoff game since 1998. Jeffrey was named the AUS Coach Of the Year, the first Mountie to receive this honour since John MacNeil in 1996.

The Mounties finished second in the AUS conference in 2010 and hosted their first home playoff game (conference semi-finals) since the new millennium. Another 0-8 season in 2011 was followed up by a successful 2012 which had the Mounties in the playoffs again, and boasted the AUS leading rusher (Jordan Botel) and the emergence of a new leader at quarterback, freshman Brandon Leyh. The 3-5 Mounties also experienced an offence without either Gary Ross or Adam Molnar, as this was the first season without one of the two star receivers in the lineup.
 
In 2013, the Mounties won the Loney Bowl for the first time since 1997. They followed up that campaign with their first undefeated season in the AUS, posting an 8-0 record en route to their second consecutive Jewett Trophy championship. In 2015, the Mounties finished in first place in the AUS regular season with a 5-3 record and hosted the Loney Bowl for the second consecutive season. They were also looking to win their third consecutive Jewett Trophy but would end up falling short to the St. Francis Xavier X-Men 24-18. 

2016 would be the first season with Scott Brady as the team's new head coach, who had been with the team as an assistant coach since 2010. Brady was the first permanent head coach in the program's recent history who was both a Mount Allison graduate and former player for the Mounties. The team ended up making the playoffs as the second place team. They would defeat the Acadia Axemen 27-18 to compete in their fourth straight Loney Bowl but would end up losing to the St. Francis Xavier X-Men 29-8. In 2017, the team would see their five-year playoff streak come to an end as they missed the playoffs for the first time since 2011. 

Following a coaching change, with Peter Fraser as the team's new head coach, the team would regress further with a 2-6 record. In 2019, the team lost their first four games of the season, but then won their next three and eventually finished with a 3-5 record and enough to qualify for the playoffs.

Recent regular season results

Mounties in the professional ranks
Mike Filer was the most recent former Mountie players to appear on a CFL roster when he played during the 2019 CFL season with the Hamilton Tiger-Cats.

Former Mountie player (1991–93) and assistant coach (1994–97) Ted Goveia has been in the CFL for a number of years, currently holding the post of Assistant General Manager and Director of Player Personnel with the Winnipeg Blue Bombers.

Notable athletes
Rick Black (’63) played fullback and was drafted in the first round of the CFL draft by the Ottawa Rough Riders.
Philippe Girard (’98) was a force to be reckoned with defensively for the Mounties, patrolling the secondary from his defensive back position. A league All-Star and All-Canadian in 1996 and 1997, Girard was also a nominee for the President's Trophy as the country's Most Outstanding Defensive Player in 1997, winning the Atlantic Conference's honour in that category. The following spring, in the 1998 Canadian Football League's (CFL) Canadian College Draft, he became the highest-drafted Mountie ever, going in the first round 5th overall to the Edmonton Eskimos. He played there for several seasons before joining former Mountie teammate Éric Lapointe as a member of Montreal Alouettes, retiring as a member of the Alouettes.
Eric Lapointe (’00) represents more than just records and statistics, although he dominated both areas of the sport during his four years as a Mountie.  He was looked to by his teammates for on-field and locker-room inspiration, and he did not disappoint. Drafted by the Edmonton Eskimos, Lapointe ended up with the Hamilton Tiger-Cats in 1999 where he rushed for 691 yards during the season, helping his team to the Grey Cup in which he was the game's leading ground gainer.  Traded to Toronto, he ultimately ended his career with his hometown Montreal Alouettes. In his final season he was the starting running back in the Grey Cup game. Eric retired with the Alouettes in 2006 after their Grey Cup loss to the BC Lions. In 2012 he was inducted into the Canadian Football Hall of Fame for his career as a Mountie.
Gary Ross (’11) The football team’s most valuable player in recent years, Ross had an unprecedented football season in 2009, breaking several school and conference records along the way. Leading the league in most of the special teams and receiving categories, the five-foot-nine Ross was selected as the Atlantic University Sport (AUS) conference’s MVP and was a strong nominee for the nation’s most outstanding player award — the Hec Crighton Trophy. While he narrowly missed this honour he was still recognized with two All-Canadian awards for the second consecutive season. A four-time AUS Player of the Week, he was named both as a first-team Canadian Interuniversity Sport (CIS) All-Canadian inside receiver, and a second-team CIS All-Canadian return specialist. He led the Atlantic conference in receptions (60), receiving yards (818 yards), receiving touchdowns (four), and all-purpose yards (1,423 yards). He has been an all-star receiver and the conference’s top special teams player in each of his four years at Mount Allison, and is now the AUS career leader in receptions (172), receiving yards (2,582), and all-purpose yards (5,990 yards). This season he was the only Atlantic conference player to average over 100 yards receiving per game (102.2 yards per game) and his 60 receptions are also a new AUS single-season record, smashing the previous mark of 48. His 818 receiving yards are a new Mounties’ single-season school record and the fourth highest total in league history. He currently ranks second in AUS history with 1,679 career punt return yards and 1,403 career kickoff return yards.
John Reardon ('97) Canadian all-star player for Mount Allison who became an actor for television and film.

References

External links 
 Mounties official site

U Sports teams
U Sports football teams
Sports teams in New Brunswick
Mount Allison University